Diksiai (formerly) is a village in Kėdainiai district municipality, in Kaunas County, in central Lithuania. According to the 2011 census, the village had a population of 8 people. There is Pajieslys cooperative farm in Diksiai.

History
Diksiai village is known since 1593. There was 4 voloks land here at that time.

At the beginning of the 20th century there was Diksiai village in Josvainiai volost, belonging to the Bulkauščiai and Goštautai families.

Demography

Images

References

Villages in Kaunas County
Kėdainiai District Municipality